Claire Farron is a fictional character from the Final Fantasy video game series made by Square Enix. She first appeared as a playable character and the main protagonist in the role-playing video game Final Fantasy XIII, in which she features as a resident of the artificial world of Cocoon. After her sister Serah is declared an enemy of Cocoon, Lightning attempts to save her. She and others are then chosen by the fal'Cie, a divided race of demigods who rule the worlds of Gran Pulse and Cocoon, to destroy Cocoon. Lightning reappears as a supporting character in Final Fantasy XIII-2, acting as protector of the Goddess Etro. She is the sole playable character in Lightning Returns: Final Fantasy XIII, wherein she sets out to save her world, which is destined to end in thirteen days. Outside the XIII series, Lightning has been featured in multiple Final Fantasy games and had cameo appearances in other video games.

Lightning was created by Motomu Toriyama, the director and scenario writer of XIII, and designed by Tetsuya Nomura, a regular character artist for the Final Fantasy series. Their idea was to create a strong female protagonist who was adept at combat and less feminine than previous Final Fantasy heroines. Aspects of her early design and personality were later altered, or transferred to other characters. After XIII, Lightning's design was revised several times to reflect her role and development in each game, particularly in Lightning Returns. Her name in Japanese, was originally a placeholder. Because of its similarity to the name of a pastry, her first name was changed to "Claire" in other countries.

Lightning has received mixed commentary from critics—much of it relating to her cold personality, which was compared to that of Final Fantasy VII'''s protagonist Cloud Strife. She was criticized for her relative absence in XIII-2. Her role in Lightning Returns met with mixed reception: some critics saw her as underdeveloped and unlikable, while others found her better developed and more human than in previous games. Lightning later appeared on lists, compiled by video game publications, of the best characters in the Final Fantasy series and in video games as a whole. She has been received favorably in polls of public opinion by Famitsu, Square Enix, and other organizations.

 Character design 

Lightning was created by Motomu Toriyama, the director of Final Fantasy XIII. Her character design was by regular Final Fantasy artist Tetsuya Nomura, who had previously served as the character designer for Final Fantasy VIII and X. Nomura has said that multiple designs—including some by staff members other than himself—were considered for Lightning, while Toriyama has claimed that Nomura's first draft "looked so cool and strong that there was no need for any retakes". Because of the graphical capacities of Final Fantasy XIIIs prospective platforms, Nomura was able to include far more detail in Lightning's design than in his previous character designs, such as her cape and facial features. This necessitated far more effort on his part. Commenting on an early form of her design, Nomura explained that she is essentially a "cool character", in that she is serious and unforgiving. However, he could not make the character too masculine for fear of losing player empathy. Characteristics from earlier versions of the design included blond or silver hair and Asian-looking facial features. Her final art was made less Asian-looking than these early drafts and her hair color changed to pink, while Hope Estheim was given silver hair. Lightning's final hair color and hairstyle were intended to reflect her femininity, and to counterbalance her athletic body. Creating her promotional CG render was fairly easy due to the number of details available concerning her.

During the early stages of production, Lightning's real name was Averia: "Eclair" was used to keep this name secret, but was eventually chosen as her official name. Her English name, Claire, was chosen because the name "Eclair" is closely associated with a type of pastry. The name "Lightning" was not chosen by Nomura but by other members of the development team: Nomura had wanted to abandon the tradition of naming Final Fantasy protagonists after weather events, and was surprised by the choice. Several models of Lightning's house were constructed for XIII but were removed due to space issues. The game's version of Odin, Lightning's Eidolon and a recurring summoned monster in the Final Fantasy series, was intended to present Lightning as a knight on horseback. He was written as a father figure for Lightning. In later games in the XIII series, Odin was developed into a friend to whom Lightning could show her deeper feelings. Daisuke Watanabe, while writing the script for XIII, paid particular attention to fleshing out Lightning's non-romantic relationship with Snow Villiers and to showing her development as a person while protecting Hope.

Due to global demand and the development staff's desire to further Lightning's character, development began for a sequel to XIII. The game tackles the question of whether Lightning is happy after the events of XIII. Even before a sequel was greenlit, Toriyama had wanted to create a truly happy ending for the character. Lightning's outfit in XIII-2 was designed by Isamu Kamikokuryo. He worked from a rough sketch by Nomura of how Lightning should appear. Nomura "fought hard" to create the draft design. The outfit was redone several times by Kamikokuryo: a qipao and a science fiction-inspired design were both discarded because they clashed with the game's atmosphere. The final design was inspired by the valkyries of Norse mythology. The outfit was meant to reflect the environment around Lightning. It features a feather motif to represent Lightning's light, delicate side and her growing powers. She was depicted as having transcended her human limits, making it difficult to depict her as a normal person.

Her outfit in Lightning Returns was designed by Nomura. He was told by Toriyama to create something representative of her final battle, with "strength" as the main guideline. The resultant outfit, which resembles a leather bodysuit, has spinal column patterns on its sleeves and is primarily colored red and white. Nomura later commented that he felt "a strong reaction within [himself]" while creating Lightning's final look. Nomura's design was Kamikokuryo's favorite out of the many outfits created for the character. Her other outfits for the game were designed by Kamikokuryo, Toshiyuki Itahana, and Toshitaka Matsuda: many of them drew inspiration from the character designs of regular Final Fantasy artist Yoshitaka Amano. In addition to the new costumes, Lightning's in-game model was rebuilt from the ground-up. Her breasts were enlarged and several of her outfits were designed to present her in a more feminine way. For the game's epilogue, Toriyama wished for Lightning to appear in an everyday setting and normal clothes. The team considered ending the game with Lightning either meeting or speaking with her allies, but Toriyama wished the story to begin and end with her alone. He has claimed that Lightning, with her solo role in Lightning Returns, was the Final Fantasy series' "first female protagonist".

Influences
Toriyama wanted Lightning to be a type of female character previously unseen in Final Fantasy games, one with an athlete's body and a less feminine nature. His guideline to Nomura was to make her strong, beautiful, and "like a female version of Cloud Strife from Final Fantasy VII". Commenting on the resemblance, Toriyama stated that the similarities between the characters only extend to their cold personalities and their military backgrounds, and that otherwise "Lightning really [is] her own person". Nomura compared the two shortly before the Japanese release of Lightning Returns, saying that he had "desired for her to be carefully developed and loved for a long time, like Cloud." Toriyama has said that, among the characters he had been involved in creating, Lightning was his favorite female character from a video game, alongside Yuna from Final Fantasy X and Yoyo from Bahamut Lagoon.

Personality

In contrast to other characters in the Final Fantasy series, whose personality traits were molded to fit a story, Toriyama conceived Lightning's basic personality before XIIIs narrative had been finalized. She has a cold demeanor, which was meant to clash in an entertaining way with Snow's outspokenness. Nomura commented that Lightning has "a strong element of mystery about her character". She originally had a flirtatious aspect to her personality, which was transferred to Oerba Yun Fang when Fang was changed from male to female. For Lightning Returns, the developers wanted to portray Lightning in several different lights, in contrast to her static personalities in prior appearances. One of their highest priorities was to make Lightning a character who had lost much in her life and become deeply vulnerable as a result. Designer Yuji Abe elaborated that, because of her losses and newfound vulnerability, Lightning came across as darker, slightly numbed to her surroundings, and "like a puppet, like someone who doesn't quite have her real self inside". He elaborated that this effect shows "the kind of vulnerability she has, and it's the point from which she starts to change afterward". The decision to expand her personality in this way was originally suggested by Yoshinori Kitase, who was concerned that Lightning's coolness in previous games had made it difficult for players to bond with her.

Across her speaking appearances, Lightning is voiced by Ali Hillis in English and Maaya Sakamoto in Japanese. Sakamoto was impressed by Lightning, whom she called "cold" and "strong". She was asked to portray Lightning's strength and to betray the character's hidden vulnerabilities. She initially found it strange to voice Lightning, as she was used to gentler roles such as Aerith Gainsborough, a central character in Final Fantasy VII and its companion media. Commenting on the difficulty of balancing Lightning's depiction as a woman and a professionally trained warrior, Kitase noted that Sakamoto's acting helped to bring out Lightning's femininity. Hillis was given the role of Lightning after speaking a few of the character's lines during audition, and was then given a book about the Final Fantasy XIII universe, which she found a little "overwhelming" when she read it. One of the challenges Hillis faced was recapturing the emotion and energy of Sakamoto's Japanese performance in the character's English rendition. She tried to help the staff of the XIII games portray Lightning as a real person: "I think that was my main priority, to make sure that Lightning had every single layer of who she was as a person, not just a game character, but a real person with layers and history and relationships to every single character in the game...even the Chocobo!" Over the course of the XIII trilogy, Hillis felt that Lightning becomes "a little more sarcastic ... a little more hardened to everything that's going on around her and ... [evolves] into a real warrior".

 Appearances 
Final Fantasy XIII series

Lightning, along with her sister Serah, is a resident of Cocoon, an artificial world hovering above the planet Gran Pulse. Each of these regions is controlled by a sect of the fal'Cie, a race of demigods whose two factions, the "Sanctum" population on Cocoon and the "Pulse" fal'Cie from Gran Pulse, are hostile toward one another. In Final Fantasy XIII: Episode Zero: Promise, a novel set before the events of XIII, it is revealed that Lightning and Serah's parents died when their children were young, and that Lightning resolved to become her sister's protector but ended up neglecting her in the process. She grows to resent Snow's romantic relationship with Serah and the anti-government activities of his group NORA. Lightning discovers too late that Serah has been branded as a l'Cie—a human cursed with magical powers and a task to complete—by the Gran Pulse fal'Cie Anima: Lightning initially thinks that Serah is using her condition as an excuse to marry Snow and drives her away. When Serah is taken prisoner by Anima, Lightning resigns from the service as a member of the Guardian Corps and volunteers herself for the Purge, a forced relocation of citizens believed to have come into contact with Anima, to save her sister.

In Final Fantasy XIII, Lightning, accompanied by Sazh Katzroy, reaches Anima along with Snow, Hope and Oerba Dia Vanille, two surviving Purge exiles. When they find Serah, she turns to crystal. Then Lightning and the party fight Anima and are marked as l'Cie when PSICOM, Cocoon's main military force, destroys Anima. Skeptical of Snow's resolve to save her sister, Lightning abandons him and Serah, both of whom are then rescued by Oerba Yun Fang and a rogue Cocoon military force called the Cavalry. Splitting up from Sazh and Vanille, Lightning ends up traveling with Hope. During their time together, Lightning inadvertently summons Odin and unknowingly supports Hope's plan to assassinate Snow as she protects and mentors him. Throughout the game, Lightning struggles to deal with her nature as a l'Cie, her anger at being made Cocoon's enemy, and her guilt at disbelieving Serah's story. After overcoming these issues, she acknowledges Snow's relationship with Serah and his faith that they will restore her. When they kill the Sanctum fal'Cie Orphan to save Cocoon, Lightning, Serah and the party except for Vanille and Fang are allowed to return to their normal lives as Vanille and Fang form a crystal pillar to stop Cocoon from colliding with Gran Pulse.Final Fantasy XIII: Episode I, a short novel set immediately after XIII, shows Lightning uneasy about whether her battle is over or not. She leaves to save Fang and Vanille, but first gives her blessing to Snow and Serah's marriage. Eventually, Lightning finds herself caught in a dark void, but she decides to keep moving forward.

In Final Fantasy XIII-2, Lightning has disappeared, and all but Serah believe that she died with Vanille and Fang to save Cocoon. In reality, Lightning was brought to Valhalla, capital of the Unseen Realm ruled by the Goddess Etro, as a direct result of Etro releasing her and the others from their fate as l'Cie. These events had distorted time and erased Lightning from history after Cocoon's fall. Hoping to atone for the deaths she caused as a l'Cie, Lightning chooses to stay in Valhalla and protect the dying Etro from Caius Ballad, an immortal man with a grudge against the goddess. Lightning eventually asks Noel Kreiss and Serah to help her stop Caius from ending time, which he plans to do by releasing "Chaos", a supernatural energy controlled by Etro, into the mortal world. Serah and Noel travel forward in time to fix distortions in history caused by Caius' interference, and Serah eventually dies when history is restored. In the DLC episode Requiem of the Goddess, Lightning is defeated by Caius and loses hope after learning of her role in Serah's death. Lightning is comforted by Serah's spirit, who asks not to be forgotten. Vowing to preserve Serah's memory, Lightning turns to crystal, which prevents her from being affected when Etro's death releases chaos and merges the mortal and unseen realms together.

In Lightning Returns: Final Fantasy XIII, Lightning is revived after 500 years by the god Bhunivelze. The world is set to end in thirteen days, and Lightning is chosen as the Savior, a spiritual guide for humanity, which has ceased to age due to the influence of chaos. In return for Lightning's help, Serah will be resurrected. Aided by Hope, Lightning frees her former allies of their emotional burdens, reunites with Odin in the form of a white Chocobo, and frequently crosses paths with Lumina, the physical manifestation of Lightning's suppressed vulnerabilities. Lightning begins to doubt her humanity, and, when she learns that Bhunivelze stole Serah's soul and manipulated Lightning's memories, she plans to betray him after he has finished building the new world. When the end of the world arrives, Lightning fights Bhunivelze, who has been shaping Lightning into Etro's replacement. Although prepared to fulfill her new role and abandon her human life, Lightning instead chooses to call for help and accept Lumina as a part of herself. Everyone she has saved, including Serah, unites with her and defeats Bhunivelze. Lightning then witnesses the creation of a new universe, into which she goes with her allies and the souls of humanity. In the epilogue, she is seen traveling to reunite with one of her friends.

Other appearances
Beyond the XIII games, Lightning has appeared in several spin-offs within the Final Fantasy franchise. In the fighting game Dissidia 012 Final Fantasy, Lightning is one of the warriors summoned by the goddess Cosmos. She was meant to debut in Dissidia Final Fantasy, but the idea was scrapped as Final Fantasy XIII had yet to be released and Square Enix did not want to reveal her abilities ahead of time. During Dissidia 012, Lightning's group is confronted by beings called Manikins, which inflict permanent death on those they defeat, thereby threatening the world's cycle of rebirth. She leads an expedition to the portal from which the Manikins are emerging, and the group sacrifice their lives to close it. Lightning has three alternate outfits in the game. She again appeared as a playable character in the 2015 arcade title, and its home console version Dissidia Final Fantasy NT.

The character was featured in a series of special player events in Final Fantasy XIV: A Realm Reborn: Lightning and monsters from her world appeared in the land of Eorzea while she was in crystal stasis between XIII-2 and Lightning Returns. It is hinted that she was sent to Eorzea by Bhunivelze to hone her skills in preparation for future battles in her world. After the events were completed, Lightning met up with the player one last time, saying that she was thankful for the time spent in Eorzea. As she was summoned back to her world, she asked the player to remember her time there. Players who participated in the events received gear and outfits modeled after items, weapons and clothing from the XIII games. Lightning also plays a role as an ally in World of Final Fantasy, appearing in her Lightning Returns outfit. Lightning was also featured in both Japanese and international versions of the mobile title Mobius Final Fantasy as part of a special story event titled "Lightning Resurrection".

Lightning features as a playable character representing the Final Fantasy XIII games in the Theatrhythm rhythm game subseries. She is featured, sporting her XIII-2 design, in Final Fantasy Airborne Brigade. Lightning is a playable character in the mobile crossover games Final Fantasy: All the Bravest and Record Keeper, a powered-up character form in Final Fantasy Explorers, a chibi figure in Final Fantasy in Itadaki Street Mobile, and a character card in Final Fantasy Artniks. In response to speculation about her continued role in the Final Fantasy series after Lightning Returns release, Kitase clarified in 2013 that she would appear in spin-off titles, but that her role in the main series had ended.

Outside the Final Fantasy franchise, Lightning features in a minigame in Kingdom Hearts Re:coded, then in a collaboration between the Final Fantasy series and Puzzle & Dragons alongside other established series characters, and versions of her outfit from XIII may be worn by protagonist Aya Brea in The 3rd Birthday and a character from arcade shooter Gunslinger Stratos 2. Maaya Sakamoto, who portrays both Aya and Lightning, voiced Aya to sound like Lightning when the outfit is equipped.

In merchandise and promotion
Lightning has been featured in Final Fantasy XIII-themed merchandise produced by Square Enix. The two pieces directly inspired by the character are necklaces and a mild perfume called "Lightning eau de toilette". Action figures of Lightning in her three main iterations were produced by Play Arts Kai, a company often hired to make figurines of characters and creatures from the Final Fantasy series. Cards depicting the character are available in the Final Fantasy Trading Card Game. Lightning appears in a live-action PlayStation commercial titled "Michael", alongside characters such as Nathan Drake, Kratos and Cole McGrath. An actress portrayed the character at the Final Fantasy 25th Anniversary Event during Asia Game Show 2013. She was portrayed again in a Japanese live-action/CGI TV commercial for Lightning Returns: Final Fantasy XIII. In April 2012, Lightning and other characters from XIII-2 were used to showcase Prada designs in a 12-page section in the male fashion magazine Arena Homme +. To promote Lightning Returns, Lightning was featured on the packaging of snacks produced by Ezaki Glico. In 2015, she was used in a CGI advertising video by French fashion house Louis Vuitton. The video was animated by Visual Works, designed by Nomura and directed by Louis Vuttion's Nicolas Ghesquière. In 2017, Lightning featured alongside Snow in a Chinese Nissan commercial.

 Reception 
Critical response
While Final Fantasy XIII was in development, Todd Ciolek of Anime News Network was unimpressed by Lightning, whom he called a "businesslike blank". Reviewing the finished game, Ciolek opined that Lightning is initially "far too distant and cold, as though the writers were so intent on creating a tough, competent heroine that they forgot to make her at all compelling". However, he admitted that Lightning becomes a more appealing lead character by the game's end. Wesley Yin-Poole of VideoGamer.com simply referred to Lightning as a female version of Cloud. 1UP.com's Jeremy Parrish commented that, barring scenes in which Lightning shows a thoughtful side, she is "your typical, sullen [Square Enix] protagonist". Conversely, GameSpot's Kevin VanOrd called Lightning a "likeable, strong-willed beauty". Martin Robinson of IGN UK said that Lightning "instantly endears herself" in comparison with Hope or Snow, but he found that, when Lightning's backstory "gets bogged down in generic swash", Sazh becomes the more appealing character. GamesRadar's Carolyin Gudmundson was unenthusiastic: she opined that, while Lightning's narrative has its merits, it "certainly isn't above and beyond what we'd typically expect". She commented that this lack of originality makes Lightning "one-dimensional and boring". Gamasutra writer Christian Nutt believed that Lightning's relationships with the cast add humanity to the narrative.

For XIII-2, Game Informers Joe Juba was disappointed that Lightning had been transferred to a supporting role in favor of Serah and Hope, whom he saw as weaker characters than Lightning. Simon Parkin of Eurogamer found that the story suffers without the driving force of Lightning's single-minded determination. VanOrd was disappointed that Lightning and Caius Ballad have relatively limited screen-time, since they come off as stronger characters than the protagonists.

In Lightning Returns, Juba criticized Lightning's lack of personal growth during the narrative, and IGN's Marty Silva felt that her increased coldness makes her "downright unlikable". VanOrd argued that Lightning is not "interesting in and of herself" and that she had turned into "a vessel for holding and pouring plot devices", whose stoicism makes it difficult for the player to connect with her. Parrish, writing for USGamer, stated that Lightning had become "downright apathetic", showing "no personality whatsoever", and that this clashed with the ability to dress her in costumes. By contrast, Parkin commented that certain side quests, such as herding sheep or retrieving a girl's doll, helped to humanize Lightning and make her likable. Similarly, Destructoid's Dale North found that the costumes and dialogue lighten her character: he argued that these elements make her less "flat and lifeless now, which is a big improvement". Dave Riley of Anime News Network felt that Lightning's stoic attitude, although out of place in XIII and XIII-2, fit her role as a god's servant in Lightning Returns. Tech Reviewer, in a feature about the portrayal of female characters in video games, was impressed with the character's depth and portrayal. Matthew Prichard of The Escapist had mixed thoughts, finding her well written and escaping many common archetypes for female characters, but disliked the revealing nature of her costumes.

Popularity
In a VideoGamer.com list of the ten best Final Fantasy characters, Lightning was placed sixth; writer Yin-Poole found her interesting in her own right despite her similarities to Cloud. In 2011, IGN ranked Lightning among the best characters in the Final Fantasy series, saying that she demonstrated that "a delicate balance can exist between strength and tenderness, even in the midst of ... incredible acrobatic feats". Lightning was ranked eighth in a similar list by GameZone's Heath Hooker: points of praise were her visual appearance and determination, which made her "one of the strongest female leaders of the Final Fantasy series" in Hooker's opinion. Cheat Code Central listed her as one of the top ten "badass" women of video games for her independence, which the writer felt distanced her from previous Final Fantasy heroines. Lightning ranked second in AfterEllen's list of the "hottest" video game characters. In Game Informers list of top ten heroes of 2010, Lightning was ranked eighth and praised as the only protagonist in Final Fantasy XIII who "seemed capable of taking on the corrupt government of Cocoon": another comment was that her "no-nonsense approach to her mission makes her the game's standout hero". She was included in two lists by Complex, which ranked her as the 19th greatest Final Fantasy character and the 39th greatest heroine in video game history.

In 2010, Lightning placed 34th in a Famitsu poll regarding the most popular video game character in Japan. She was voted the best-liked female Final Fantasy character in a 2013 poll by Square Enix, and, in that year's Dengeki PlayStation Awards, she was voted best video game character of the year for her appearance in Lightning Returns. She came first in a Microsoft poll to determine the most popular character of the Final Fantasy XIII games. In 2014, readers of IGN voted her the best character in XIII. At PAX Prime 2013, she took third place in a list, compiled by journalists and game developers, of the top female characters in western and Japanese role-playing video games. In a Famitsu poll from 2017, Lightning was voted as the second most wanted character fans expect to be featured in another Square Enix's franchise, Kingdom Hearts, being surpassed only by Noctis Lucis Caelum from Final Fantasy XV.

Analysis
In the book The Music of Nobuo Uematsu in the Final Fantasy Series Richard Anatone describes Lightning's theme from the first game as one that transcends gendered generalizations and helps to show her personality, making her stand out within the main cast even if none of them are the sole leading character. In ConsumAuthors: The New Generational Nuclei the character is described as the ideal figure for a woman in the modernity. Interactive Storytelling for Video Games: Proven Writing Techniques for Role'' describes her as a mother figure trying to take care of her sister despite initial stoic portrayal in the game's beginning.

Notes

References 

Characters designed by Tetsuya Nomura
Deity characters in video games
Female characters in video games
Fictional characters with healing abilities
Fictional goddesses
Fictional military sergeants
Fictional swordfighters in video games
Final Fantasy characters
Final Fantasy XIII
Square Enix protagonists
Video game characters introduced in 2009
Woman soldier and warrior characters in video games
Time travelers
Video game characters who use magic
Video game characters with electric or magnetic abilities